James Wallace (1770–1852) was a minister of the Church of Scotland who served as Moderator of the General Assembly in 1831, the highest position in the Scottish church.

Life

He was born in Dumfriesshire on 1770. He was licensed to preach by the Presbytery of Edinburgh in 1795.

In April 1802 he was ordained as minister of Ballingry in Fife. In November 1806, under the patronsage of Charles Hamilton, 8th Earl of Haddington he was translated to Whitekirk in East Lothian. In 1825 Edinburgh University awarded him an honorary Doctor of Divinity (DD).

During his ministry (1830-2) he organised the remodelling of the transepts of the church.

In 1831 he succeeded Rev William Singer as Moderator of the General Assembly of the Church of Scotland the highest position in the Scottish Church. He was succeeded in turn by the infamous Rev Thomas Chalmers.

He died in Whitekirk manse on 11 November 1852 and is buried in the graveyard of his church.

The grave lies east of the church and is marked by an obelisk. The inscription is eroding.

Publications
An Account of the Parish of Whitekirk and Tyninghame (1845)

References
 

1770 births
1852 deaths
People from Dumfries and Galloway
Moderators of the General Assembly of the Church of Scotland